Aftermarket may refer to:
 Aftermarket (merchandise), any market where customers who buy one product or service are likely to buy a related, follow-on product
 Aftermarket (automotive), the addition of non-factory parts, accessories and upgrades to a motor vehicle also to include removal of parts after vehicle is placed on market
 Aftermarket (finance), or secondary market in financial parlance, the trading of securities that have already been issued
 The market for parts that are no longer made, see new old stock

zh:二级市场